Dolný Lopašov is a village and municipality in Piešťany District in the Trnava Region of western Slovakia. The current mayor of Dolný Lopašov is Mário Beblavý, who won the election held on November 10, 2018 as an independent candidate.

History
In historical records the village was first mentioned in 1394.

Geography
The municipality lies at an altitude of 207 metres and covers an area of 22.934 km². It has a population of about 979 people.

Genealogical resources

The records for genealogical research are available at the state archive "Statny Archiv in Bratislava, Slovakia"

 Roman Catholic church records (births/marriages/deaths): 1698-1897 (parish A)

See also
 List of municipalities and towns in Slovakia

References

External links

 Official page
https://web.archive.org/web/20071116010355/http://www.statistics.sk/mosmis/eng/run.html
http://www.obecdlopasov.sk
http://turista.szm.sk
Surnames of living people in Dolny Lopasov

Villages and municipalities in Piešťany District